Martel Maxwell (born 9 March 1977) is a Scottish journalist, writer, radio and television presenter. Since 2017, she has co-presented the property show Homes Under the Hammer.

Early life
Maxwell was born on 9 March 1977, and was raised in Dundee. She attended the High School of Dundee, before studying law at the University of Edinburgh and then taking a postgraduate diploma in law at the University of Dundee. After deciding against a career in the law, Maxwell turned to journalism instead.

Newspaper journalism
Maxwell got her first post in journalism as a graduate intern at The Sun and took a diploma in newspaper journalism at London City University. She spent seven years at The Sun as a reporter in city, women's news, and showbusiness, before going freelance.

After going freelance, Maxwell wrote opinion pieces for The Scottish Sun and since 2013 has written a weekly column for the Evening Telegraph in Dundee.

Broadcast journalism
Maxwell's move into broadcast journalism came in 2010 when she became a reporter on the BBC show The One Show and then became a regular entertainment guest on the ITV show Lorraine and one of the presenters of a short-lived BBC3 consumer affairs programme Don't Get Screwed and BBC Scotland magazine show On the Road. Since 2017, she has been one of the three presenters of the BBC property programme Homes Under the Hammer, replacing Lucy Alexander.

Maxwell has also guest presented on BBC Radio Scotland and in 2008, had her own show on Edinburgh station Talk 107 until the station folded.  In 2021, she provided the voiceover narration for the third series of BBC Scotland's documentary Inside Central Station.

Writer
Maxwell published a novel, Scandalous, in 2010. Based on her experiences as a showbusiness reporter, The Daily Telegraph considered that it gave "a thrilling insight into the celebrity-baiting world of the kiss and tell" but also considered that "the narrative is weighed down by product placement".

Personal life
Maxwell lives near Dundee with her husband, Jamie, and their three sons.

References

External links

Living people
People from Dundee
Journalists from Dundee
People educated at the High School of Dundee
Alumni of the University of Dundee
Alumni of the University of Edinburgh
The Sun (United Kingdom) people
Scottish television presenters
Scottish radio presenters
Scottish women radio presenters
Scottish women television presenters
Scottish television journalists
1977 births